UNCG Soccer Stadium is a 3,540-capacity stadium located in Greensboro, North Carolina. The stadium is home to the University of North Carolina at Greensboro Spartans men's and women's soccer teams.  It has also hosted the NCAA Women's Soccer Championship on several occasions.  The stadium opened for soccer in 1991. For the championship games, extra bleachers were brought in to expand the capacity to 10,583 people.

History 
The stadium will host the final of the 2020 Southern Conference Men's Soccer Tournament.

UNCG Soccer Stadium will be one of the hosts for the 2020 NCAA Division I Men's Soccer Tournament and the 2020 NCAA Division I Women's Soccer Tournament.

References

External links
 UNCG Athletic Facilities
 

UNC Greensboro Spartans sports venues
Soccer venues in North Carolina
College soccer venues in the United States
Sports venues in Greensboro, North Carolina
UNC Greensboro Spartans soccer
North Carolina Fusion U23
Sports venues completed in 1991
1991 establishments in North Carolina